Sir Robert Eden, 1st Baronet, of Maryland, 23rd Proprietary Governor of Maryland (14 September 1741 – 2 September 1784) was a British official and the last colonial Governor of Maryland. Although a popular governor and an able administrator, Eden's authority was overthrown by the events of the American Revolution, and in June 1776 he was invited by the Maryland Convention to leave for England. Eden was well-regarded at home and in the same year, 1776, he was made a baronet. He eventually returned to Maryland where he died in 1784 at the age of 42. He was buried in Annapolis and was succeeded in the baronetcy by his eldest son, Frederick, a noted author.

Early life
Eden was born in Durham, England, on 14 September 1741, the second son of Sir Robert Eden, 3rd Baronet, of West Auckland, and the brother of William Eden, 1st Baron Auckland and Morton Eden, 1st Baron Henley and a relative of North Carolina Governor Charles Eden.

Career
In 1763 Eden made an advantageous marriage, wedding Caroline Calvert, daughter of Maryland's proprietor Charles Calvert, 5th Baron Baltimore. In 1766 Caroline bore a son, Frederick. Three years later, in 1769, aged just 28, Robert Eden succeeded Horatio Sharpe as Governor of Maryland, the highest office in the province. As governor, Eden would attempt to maintain authority over the increasingly rebellious province during the tumultuous years preceding the American Revolution.

Maryland and the American War of Independence

Eden was not among those who believed that coercion would force Marylanders into loyalty to the mother country. During the 1770s opposition to British taxation grew, and the governor's authority began to falter. On 19 April 1774 Eden was forced to prorogue the Colonial Assembly, the last occasion on which it would convene. From this point on the government of Maryland was increasingly in the hands of the Revolutionaries. On 19 October 1774 the Peggy Stewart was burned in Annapolis harbor in protest against taxes on tea, in imitation of the famous Boston Tea Party, which took place on 16 December 1773.

On 30 December 1774 Eden wrote:

Although Eden had some sympathy with the colonists' grievances, he was firmly opposed to armed opposition to the Crown. In the event, Maryland was the only state that did not forcibly eject its last colonial governor from office, choosing instead a formal and largely courteous transfer of power. By 1775 Eden's authority had been effectively usurped by the Annapolis Convention and Eden was eventually asked by the Maryland Council of Safety to step down as governor. The Maryland Convention had been pressed by the Continental Congress (and the Virginians in particular) to arrest and detain Eden but they demurred, preferring to avoid such an "extreme" measure. Instead they argued that:

Eventually the Maryland Convention formally asked the governor to leave, and Governor Eden finally departed Maryland for England in the ship Fowey on 23 June 1776.

He was created a baronet, of Maryland in North America, on 19 October 1776.

Family life

On 26 April 1763 Eden married Caroline Calvert, daughter of Charles Calvert, 5th Baron Baltimore, and in 1769 he succeeded Governor Horatio Sharpe as Governor of Maryland. Caroline was half-sister to Benedict Swingate Calvert, a Judge of the Land office with whom Eden shared a love of horse racing. Benedict Swingate Calvert soon found himself appointed to the Governor's Council.

His son Sir Frederick Morton Eden, 2nd Baronet, of Maryland (1766–1809) was a pioneering writer and the author of The State of the Poor, published in 3 volumes in 1797.

Death and legacy
Eden died on 2 September 1784 and was buried in Annapolis, Maryland. He was succeeded in the baronetcy by his eldest son, Frederick. Eden was an ancestor of the 20th century British Prime Minister Anthony Eden. The town of Denton, Maryland, originally Edenton or Eden Town, was named for him.

See also
Eden baronets

References
 Andrews, Matthew Page, History of Maryland, Doubleday Doran & Co, New York, (1929)

Notes

External links

American Loyalists from Maryland
Colonial Governors of Maryland
British officials in the American Revolution
Baronets in the Baronetage of Great Britain
1741 births
1784 deaths
Robert Eden
Younger sons of baronets